The Spelling Bee Ghana (commonly called the Ghana National Spelling Bee) is an annual spelling bee held in the Ghana since 2007. The bee is run on a not-for-profit, charity basis by Ghanaian Entrepreneur, CEO of Young Educators Foundation, Eugenia Tachie-Menson and is supported by US Embassy in Ghana. The initiative was inspired by the Scripps National Spelling Bee run in the United States. Since its inception, the winners of the competition present Ghana at the Scripps National Spelling Bee.

Sponsors 
The Spelling Bee has been sponsored and supported over the years by the government of Ghana through the Ghana Education Service and the Ministry of Education, Indomie Ghana, MTN Ghana, US Embassy in Ghana, USAID, MultiChoice Ghana and many others.

List of winners

2022 Spelling Bee 
The 2022 finals edition was held at the Alisa Hotel in the Greater Accra region with a total of 115 total participants beginning at the round one. The number reduced as it continued to the 12th round which had three finalists.

The champion of the 2022 Spelling Bee, N’Adom Darko-Asare had the winning word 'BATHYPELAGIC' and was awarded with a trip to Washington DC, USA to represent Ghana at the 2022 Scripps National Spelling Bee. Among the list of items won include:

 $500 spending money
 Engraved trophy
 Fully-installed DStv Explora decoder with a 6-month subscription
 Indomie products
 Gold medal
 GH¢300 Goil fuel vouchers.

A 10-year-old Nii Odartey Elorm Manyo-Plange of The Roman Ridge School was the first runner-up and her prizes are as follows:

 Trip to Nairobi sponsored by Kenya Airways with $150 spending money
 Fully-installed DStv HD Zapper decoder with 3 months compact viewing
 Indomie products
 Silver medal
 GH¢150 Goil fuel vouchers.

11-year-old Aarna Bhaveshkumar Tailor from the DPS International Ghana, Tema, became the second runner-up. She was awarded the following;

 A trip to Nairobi sponsored by Kenya Airways with $150 spending money
 Fully-installed DStv HD Zapper decoder with 3 months compact viewing
 Indomie products
 Bronze medal
 GH¢150 Goil fuel vouchers

The competition awarded participating spellers the following;

 Certificate of recognition
 Indomie products
 Customised T-shirts
 Commemorative medals
 Customised bag
 Novels donated by the PAS-US Embassy 
The top three winners’ schools each received a certificate of recognition and GH¢1,000 fuel vouchers sponsored by GOIL.

See also 

 Spelling bee
 Scripps National Spelling Bee

References 

Spelling competitions
2007 establishments in Ghana
Education in Ghana
Educational organisations based in Ghana